Mary Jane Gibson is an American Democratic politician from Belmont, Massachusetts. She represented the 26th Middlesex district in the Massachusetts House of Representatives from 1979 to 1993.

See also
 1979-1980 Massachusetts legislature

References

Year of birth missing
Year of death missing
Members of the Massachusetts House of Representatives
Women state legislators in Massachusetts
20th-century American women politicians
20th-century American politicians
People from Belmont, Massachusetts